The Pacific Northwest Collegiate Lacrosse League (PNCLL) is a conference in the Men's Collegiate Lacrosse Association. The PNCLL is divided into two divisions, Division I and Division II, and incorporates teams from the U.S. States of Oregon, Washington, Idaho, and Montana, as well as from the Canadian Province of British Columbia.

Current Teams

Former Members

Past Conference Champions

Division I 

Italic Text denotes MCLA National Runner-up
* Indicates MCLA Runner-Up

Division II 

Bold Text denotes MCLA National Champion

MCLA All-Americans

MCLA Division 1

MCLA Division 2

Team Websites
Boise State University Lacrosse
Oregon State University Lacrosse
Portland State University Lacrosse
Simon Fraser University Lacrosse
University of Idaho Lacrosse
University of Montana Lacrosse
University of Oregon Lacrosse
University of Washington Lacrosse
Washington State University Lacrosse
Western Oregon University Lacrosse

External links
Official PNCLL website
Official MCLA website

See also
Men's Collegiate Lacrosse Association

College lacrosse leagues in the United States